is a Japanese former professional footballer who played as a midfielder. His elder brother Keisuke Ota is also former footballer.

Club career
Ota was born in Hamamatsu on 11 June 1983. He joined J1 League club Júbilo Iwata for youth team in 2002. He became a regular player as right side midfielder in 2005. However his opportunity to play decreased behind new player Yuichi Komano from 2008. In July 2009, he left the club aims to transfer to Europe. However he could not transfer to Europe. After half year blank, he joined Vegalta Sendai in 2010. Although he could not play many matches in 2010, he played many matches as forward in 2011. In 2012, he became a regular player as his original position, right side midfielder and Vegalta finished at the 2nd place which is best results in the club history. He played all 34 matches for 3 years in a row (2012-2014). In 2015, he re-joined Júbilo Iwata for the first time in 6 years. Although Júbilo was relegated to J2 League from 2014, he played many matches and Júbilo was promoted to J1 end of 2015 season. However his opportunity to play decreased from 2017 season.

National team career
In 2007, Ota was selected Japan national team for 2007 Asian Cup. Although he did not play in the match, Japan won the 4th place.

Club statistics

References

External links

1983 births
Living people
Association football people from Shizuoka Prefecture
Japanese footballers
J1 League players
J2 League players
Júbilo Iwata players
Vegalta Sendai players
2007 AFC Asian Cup players
Association football midfielders